Gloucester College, Oxford, was a Benedictine institution of the University of Oxford in Oxford, England, from the late 13th century until the dissolution of the monasteries in the 16th century. It was never a typical college of the University, in that there was an internal division in the college, by staircase units, into parts where the monasteries sending monks had effective authority. The overall head was a Prior.

It later became Gloucester Hall, an academic hall and annexe of St John's College and was again refounded in 1714 as Worcester College by Sir Thomas Cookes.

History
The initial foundation was from 1283. John Giffard gave a house, in Stockwell Street, Oxford. There was early friction with the local Carmelites. This was a donation to the Benedictines of the province of Canterbury. Control of the 13 places for monks fell to the abbey of St. Peter, Gloucester. The first prior was Henry de Heliun.

Pope Benedict XII in 1337 laid down, in the bull Pastor bonus, that 5% of Benedictine monks should be university students. But from the middle of the fourteenth century onwards there was an alternative, at the University of Cambridge. There were also the Benedictine Durham College, Oxford, and Canterbury College, Oxford. Even though the catchment area after 1337 included the Province of York, numbers of students were never high, one reason being the cost of living in Oxford (which the home monastery had to meet). After the Black Death, Gloucester College was closed for a time. In 1537 it was found to have 32 students.

At the Dissolution the property passed to the English Crown, then to the Bishop of Oxford in 1542, who sold it to Sir Thomas White. White was the founder of St John's College, Oxford, and Gloucester Hall, as it then became, was treated as an Annexe to St John's College.

The penultimate Principal of Gloucester Hall, Benjamin Woodroffe, established a "Greek College" for Greek Orthodox students to come to Oxford, part of a scheme to make ecumenical links with the Church of England. This was active from 1699 to 1705, although only 15 Greeks are recorded as members.

The status of Gloucester Hall changed in the 18th century, when it was refounded in 1714 by Sir Thomas Cookes as Worcester College, Oxford. Oxford's Gloucester Green, which was opposite the old College, and the Gloucester House building within the current college preserve the name.

Principals of Gloucester Hall
1560–1561 William Stocke 
1561–1563 Richard Eden 
1563–1564 Thomas Palmer
1564–1576 William Stocke
1576–1580 Henry Russell
1580–1581 Christopher Bagshawe
1581–1593 John Delabere 
1593–1626 John Hawley
1626–1647 Degory Wheare 
1647–1647 John Maplett
1647–1660 Tobias Garbrand
1660–1662 John Maplett
1662–1692 Byrom Eaton 
1692–1711 Benjamin Woodroffe
1712–1714 Richard Blechynden.

Alumni
Those who studied at the college and hall include:

Gloucester College (1283–1542)
 Henry Bradshaw
 Adam Easton
 John Feckenham
 John Lydgate (supposed)
 Richard of Wallingford

Gloucester Hall (1542–1714)
 Robert Catesby
 Kenelm Digby
 Richard Lovelace
 Thomas Coryate
 Edward Kelley

Notes and references

1283 establishments in England
Educational institutions established in the 13th century
1714 disestablishments in England
Former colleges and halls of the University of Oxford
Benedictine colleges and universities
St John's College, Oxford
Worcester College, Oxford
Christianity in Oxford